Rose Zang Nguele (born May 12, 1947) is a Cameroonian politician. She served as the minister of social affairs  of Cameroon from 1984 to 1988 and as a member of the National Assembly from 1992 to 1997.

References 

1947 births
Living people
Government ministers of Cameroon
20th-century Cameroonian women politicians
20th-century Cameroonian politicians
Women government ministers of Cameroon
Members of the National Assembly (Cameroon)